Events in the year 1814 in Art.

Events
A Madonna of St Jerome by Antonio da Correggio is returned to Parma, eighteen years after being looted by the French.

Works
 Jean-Antoine Alavoine – The Elephant of the Bastille (full-size model)
Merry-Joseph Blondel - La Circassienne au Bain
 Antonio Canova – The Three Graces (sculpture)
 Louis Daguerre – Interior of a Chapel of the Church of the Feuillants
 Jacques-Louis David – Leonidas at Thermopylae
 Francisco Goya
The Second of May 1808
The Third of May 1808
 Hokusai
 The Dream of the Fisherman's Wife (woodcut)
 Hokusai Manga (publication begins)
 Jean Auguste Dominique Ingres
 Grande Odalisque
 Portrait of Caroline Murat, Queen of Naples
 Raphael and La Fornarina
 Thomas Lawrence – The Prince Regent (oil sketch)
Ernest Meissonier - The Campaign of France
 John Smith of Darnick – William Wallace Statue, Bemersyde

Births
January 17 – John Mix Stanley, American painter (died 1872)
February 18 – Gustav Fabergé, Baltic German jeweller (died 1894)
March 3 – Louis Buvelot, Swiss-Australian painter (died 1888)
March 9 (February 25 O.S.) – Taras Shevchenko, Ukrainian poet and artist (died 1861)
March 22 – Thomas Crawford, American sculptor (died 1857)
May 21 – Louis Janmot, French painter and poet (died 1892)
May 22 – Amalia Lindegren, Swedish painter (died 1891)
July – Charles Lucy, English historical painter (died 1873)
July 13 – Johann Halbig, German classicist sculptor (died 1882)
August 26 – Johann Pucher, Slovene Catholic priest, inventor, scientist, photographer, artist and poet (died 1864)
September 1 – John Cooke Bourne, English topographical artist, lithographer and photographer (died 1896)
September 15 – Ferdinand von Arnim, German architect and watercolour painter (died 1866)
October 4 – Jean-François Millet, French painter (died 1875)
October 12 – Ernest Gambart, Belgian-born art dealer (died 1902)
date unknown – Frederick William Fairholt, English engraver (died 1866)

Deaths
January 5 – Johann Friedrich Bause, German engraver (born 1738)
January 20 – Jean-François Pierre Peyron, French neoclassical painter (born 1744)
January 28 – Pierre Lacour, French painter (born 1745)
February 26 – Johan Tobias Sergel, Swedish sculptor born in Stockholm (born 1740)
February 27 – Margaret Bingham, British painter and writer (born 1740)
March 29 – Claude Michel, French sculptor in the Rococo style (born 1738)
May 31 – Arend Johan van Glinstra, Dutch painter (born 1754)
June 17 – Henry Tresham, Irish-born painter of large-scale history paintings (born 1751)
August 21 – Antonio Carnicero, Spanish painter in the Neoclassical style (born 1748)
November 18 – Aleijadinho, Colonial Brazil-born sculptor and architect (born 1730/1738)
November 30 – Jean-Michel Moreau, illustrator and engraver  (born 1741)
December 22 – Pieter Faes, Dutch  painter of flowers and fruit (born 1760)
date unknown
Pierre Chasselat, French miniature painter (born 1753)
Grigory Ostrovsky, Russian portraitist (born 1756)
Andries Vermeulen, Dutch painter (born 1763) 

 
Years of the 19th century in art
1810s in art